"Ordinary Things" is the debut single by Danish band Lukas Graham. The song was released in Denmark as a digital download on 17 October 2011 as the lead single from their self-titled debut studio album. It peaked at number two on the Danish Singles Chart. The song was written by Lukas Forchhammer, Sebastian Fogh, Emil Nielsen and Stefan Forrest.

Track listing

Charts

Release history

References

2011 songs
2011 debut singles
Lukas Graham songs
Songs written by Lukas Forchhammer
Songs written by Stefan Forrest
Copenhagen Records singles